Volčja Draga is a settlement in the Municipality of Renče–Vogrsko in the Littoral region of Slovenia.

Name
The name Volčja Draga literally means 'wolf valley'. The first part of the name is derived from the Slovene adjective volčji (literally, 'wolf'), which may refer to the animal (< volk 'wolf') or to the related Slavic personal name *Vьlkъ. The second part of the name is from the common noun draga 'small, narrow valley', referring to the geographical location of the settlement.

Industry 
Volčja Draga has many factories and independent tradesmen.

References

External links
Volčja Draga on Geopedia

Populated places in the Municipality of Renče-Vogrsko